Shadowmaker is the fourteenth studio album by German heavy metal band Running Wild, released on 20 April 2012. It is the band's first studio album since 2005's Rogues en Vogue and the first since the band's return after breaking up in 2009.

Background 
Since the band's return to the scene, Rolf wrote 10 new tracks for Shadowmaker, among them are the midtempo opener "Piece of the Action", the uptempo number "Shadowmaker" (roughly the same pace as "Angel Of Mercy" from Rogues en Vogue) and the monumental eight-minute track "Dracula", based on Bram Stoker's novel and the Christopher Lee movies. In an interview, he talks about the album:
 "To me, Shadowmaker is a very special album because there was no pressure, time wise or otherwise. I feel it's clearly audible that this relaxed attitude helped me to write one of the strongest Running Wild recordings of all time."

Songs
"Me & the Boys" was originally composed for Rolf Kasparek's side project Toxic Taste

Track listing
All songs written and composed by Rolf Kasparek

Release
 The slipcase release contains a DVD with a track-by-track commentary session by Rolf Kasparek
 The 2x limited edition 12" vinyl release (showing the album cover with a dark silver coloured image than the original shown above) comes with the original CD, a DVD in a black jewel case containing the above features and also includes a postcard, stickers, a poster and a 30-page LP format book with the history of the band packaged in a cardboard box, limited to 1,000 copies worldwide

Personnel
Rock 'n' Rolf – vocals, guitars
Peter Jordan – lead guitar, vocals (choirs)

Note
 The bass and drums were recorded by anonymous guests that did not want to be identified.

Production
Jens Reinhold – cover art, artwork
Niki Nowy – engineering, mastering
Peter Jordan – engineering
Rock 'n' Rolf – producer
Katharina Nowy – additional producing
Markus "Max" Chemnitz – photography

Charts

References

2012 albums
Running Wild (band) albums